Michael Roche (born 11 September 1971) is an Irish boxer. He competed in the men's light middleweight event at the 2000 Summer Olympics.

References

External links
 

1971 births
Living people
Irish male boxers
Olympic boxers of Ireland
Boxers at the 2000 Summer Olympics
Light-middleweight boxers